Joseph Andrew Gavagan (August 20, 1892 – October 18, 1968) was an American World War I veteran, lawyer, and politician who served seven terms as a United States representative from New York from 1929 to 1943.

Early life
Born in New York City on August 20, 1892, he attended the public and parochial schools and graduated from the law department of Fordham University in 1920.

World War I 
During World War I, he enlisted as a private and later was promoted to second lieutenant in the Quartermaster Corps and served from August 20, 1917, to October 13, 1919. He served at: Fort Totten, New York; Camp Alfred Vail, New Jersey; and Camp Gordon Johnston, Florida. He was a first lieutenant in the Quartermaster Reserve Corps from 1920 to 1925.

Political career  
Gavagan was admitted to the bar in 1920, and practiced law in New York City. A Democrat, he was a member of the New York State Assembly (New York Co., 22nd D.) in 1923, 1924, 1925, 1926, 1927, 1928 and 1929.

Congressman

Gavagan was elected to the 71st United States Congress to fill the vacancy caused by the death of Royal H. Weller; he was re-elected to the 72nd and to the six succeeding Congresses and held office from November 5, 1929, to December 30, 1943, when he resigned. While in the House of Representatives, he was chairman of the Committee on Elections No. 2 (Seventy-second through Seventy-sixth Congresses) and Committee on War Claims (Seventy-seventh and Seventy-eighth Congresses).

Gavagan tried for years to pass an anti-lynching law; having grown up in New York's Hell's Kitchen, he saw discrimination against the Irish, African Americans, and other ethnic and racial minorities. Gavagan's argument for equal and fair treatment was that lynching meant mob rule, and mob rule meant that the rule of law was not respected. The Gavagan bill was never passed because southern Democrats were able to block it. From the 1960s to the 1980s, Claude Pepper served as a Congressman; he had been a United States senator in the 1930s and 1940s. As an elder statesman in the House, Pepper admitted that the major regret of his career was that he had not supported the Gavagan Anti-Lynching Law.

Later life
Gavagan was resigned from Congress after winning election as a justice of the New York Supreme Court; he was re-elected in 1957, and was scheduled to retire on December 31, 1968.

Death and burial
He maintained a summer house in Manchester, Vermont, and died at Putnam Memorial Hospital in Bennington, Vermont on October 18, 1968. He was interred at Gate of Heaven Cemetery in Hawthorne, New York.

Family
In November 1933, Gavagan married Dorothy Whitehead, who had been his secretary in his Washington Congressional office. They were the parents of a son, Joseph Jr., and a daughter, Joan, who was the wife of Thomas G. Gorman.

References

Sources

Newspapers

Internet

External links

1892 births
1968 deaths
People from Hell's Kitchen, Manhattan
Fordham University School of Law alumni
United States Army officers
Democratic Party members of the New York State Assembly
New York Supreme Court Justices
Quartermasters
Democratic Party members of the United States House of Representatives from New York (state)
Burials at Gate of Heaven Cemetery (Hawthorne, New York)
American anti-lynching activists
20th-century American judges
Activists from New York (state)
20th-century American politicians